Glochidion moonii is a species of plant in the family Phyllanthaceae. It is endemic to Sri Lanka. The plant is known as බූ හුනුකිරිල්ල (bu hunukirilla) in Sinhala.

Description
Glochidion moonii has hairy leaves that are lanceolate-oval in shape with acute ends (acuminate), and conspicuously reticulate veins. Branchlets are more or less tomentose. The numerous flowers are pale yellow; male flowers are found on long hairy peduncles while female flowers are sessile. Flowers may be solitary or grouped in axillary fascicles. Fruits are pubescent, strongly 3-lobed capsules, each topped by a persistent style.

Ecology
Glochidion moonii is found in the rain forest understory of low montane and wet zones.

External links
 http://eol.org/pages/1143209/overview
 http://plants.jstor.org/specimen/br0000005100378
 https://www.gbif.org/species/3080460
 https://www.gbif.org/species/120777986
 http://www.tropicos.org/Name/50248245

moonii
Endemic flora of Sri Lanka
Vulnerable flora of Asia